Sinfin Central station was in the city of Derby, Derbyshire, England.

On 4 October 1976 a new unstaffed passenger station was opened by British Rail to serve the nearby Rolls-Royce factory. Despite Derby City Council's efforts to encourage usage of public transport, based on the Cross-City Line in Birmingham, the service was very underused.

The service was reduced to one return train per day in 1992, with the return departing Sinfin Central at 06:57. The service did not run at weekends, and there was no evening return. This ran until 1993, when the Derwent Valley Line, which interworked with the Sinfin branch, changed to using Sprinter trains. Sprinters were not permitted on the branch because of compatibility issues with the obsolete low-voltage track circuits used on the line. The last train ran on 17 May 1993, and the train service was replaced with a taxi.

On 2 May 1997, the line became part of the Central Trains franchise as part of the privatisation of British Rail, but none of its trains ever stopped at the station. On 6 November 1997, Central Trains and the Director of Passenger Rail Franchising proposed the closure of the line. It was granted on 21 May 1998 by Rail Regulator John Swift QC. During the final year, there were three regular users of the taxi at a single fare of £1.20.

There was no public road access to the station or car park, and the path is still in situ.

The line survives to serve the Rolls-Royce plant, and the station is still in situ.

References

External links
  The Closure Acceptance Form from the Rail Regulations Office

Disused railway stations in Derby
Railway stations opened by British Rail
Railway stations in Great Britain opened in 1976
Railway stations in Great Britain closed in 1993